Jetur Rose Riggs (June 20, 1809 – November 5, 1869) was an American Anti-Lecompton Democrat who represented  in the U.S. representative for one term from 1859 to 1861.

Early life and career
Born near Drakesville (now known as the Ledgewood section of Roxbury Township), Morris County, Riggs received an academic education. He graduated from the New York College of Physicians and Surgeons in 1837 and commenced practice in Newfoundland, New Jersey.

He served as member of the New Jersey General Assembly in 1836. He was one of the founders of the District Medical Society of Passaic County, in 1844 and served as president 1846–1848. He moved to California during the California Gold Rush in 1849 and was in charge of the hospital at Sutter's Fort. He returned to New Jersey and settled in Paterson in 1852. He served as member of the New Jersey Senate in 1855–1858.

Congress and later life
Riggs was elected as an Anti-Lecompton Democrat to the Thirty-sixth Congress, serving in office from March 4, 1859 – March 3, 1861, but was not a candidate for renomination in 1860.

After leaving Congress, he resumed the practice of medicine in Paterson, later moved to Drakesville (now Ledgewood), New Jersey, and died there November 5, 1869. He was interred in the Presbyterian Cemetery, Succasunna, New Jersey.

External links

Jetur Rose Riggs at The Political Graveyard

1809 births
1869 deaths
Democratic Party members of the United States House of Representatives from New Jersey
Democratic Party New Jersey state senators
People from Roxbury, New Jersey
Politicians from Morris County, New Jersey
Physicians from New Jersey
Democratic Party members of the New Jersey General Assembly
Burials in New Jersey
19th-century American politicians
New York College of Physicians and Surgeons alumni